

Introduction 

The 2009 AMA Pro Daytona Sportbike Championship was the first running of the AMA Pro Daytona Sportbike Championship, an American motorcycle racing series that acts as a feeder series for the AMA Pro American Superbike Championship. The series replaced the AMA Formula Xtreme Championship. Danny Eslick won his first championship riding a Buell. Mike Baldwin was the crew chief.

Calendar and results

Riders' standings

Entry list

All entries utilize Dunlop tyres.

See also
2009 AMA Pro American Superbike Championship season

References

AMA Pro Daytona Sportbike Championship
AMA Pro Daytona Sportbike